The 2014-15 season is Maccabi Haifa's 57th season in Israeli Premier League, and their 33rd consecutive season in the top division of Israeli football.

Club

Squad information

Transfers

Transfers in

Total spending:

Transfers out

Total income: 
Expenditure:

Players out on loan

Current coaching staff

{|class="wikitable"
|+
! style="background-color:white; color:black;" scope="col"|Position
! style="background-color:white; color:black;" scope="col"|Staff
|-

Pre-season and friendlies

Competitions

Ligat Ha'Al

Regular season

With Aleksandar Stanojević

With Marco Balbul

Table

Play-off

Table

Results summary

Results by round

State Cup

Round of 32

Round of 16

Toto Cup

Group stage

Knockout phase

Quarter-final

Maccabi Haifa won 6–4 on aggregate

Semi-final

Final

Squad statistics

Updated on 30 May 2015

Goals

Disciplinary record
Last updated on 2 May 2015

Disciplinary record Toto Cup

Penalties

Overall
{|class="wikitable" style="text-align: center;"
|-
!
!Total
!Home
!Away
!Naturel
|-
|align=left| Games played          || 45 || 22 || 22 || 2
|-
|align=left| Games won             || 20 || 14 || 5 || 1
|-
|align=left| Games drawn           || 9 || 2 || 7 || -
|-
|align=left| Games lost           || 17 || 6 || 10 || 1
|-
|align=left| Biggest win           || 5-0 vs F.C. Ashdod || 5-0 vs F.C. Ashdod || 4-0 vs Maccabi Netanya 4-0 vs Hapoel Haifa || 3-1 vs F.C. Ashdod
|-
|align=left| Biggest loss          || 0-2 vs Bnei Sakhnin 1-3 vs Maccabi Tel Aviv 0-2 vs Hapoel Ra'anana 0-2 vs Hapoel Be'er Sheva 1-3 vs Hapoel Ironi Kiryat Shmona 1-3 Beitar Jerusalem  1–3 vs Hapoel Ironi Kiryat Shmona || 0-2 vs Hapoel Ra'anana 1-3 Hapoel Ironi Kiryat Shmona 1-3 Beitar Jerusalem  vs Hapoel Ironi Kiryat Shmona  || 0-2 vs Bnei Sakhnin 1-3 vs Maccabi Tel Aviv 0-2 vs Hapoel Be'er Sheva || 1-2 vs Maccabi Tel Aviv
|-
|align=left| Biggest win (League)  || 5-0 vs F.C. Ashdod   || 5-0 vs F.C. Ashdod ||  4-0 vs Maccabi Netanya 4-0 vs Hapoel Haifa || N/A
|-
|align=left| Biggest loss (League) ||  1-3 vs Maccabi Tel Aviv 0-2 vs Hapoel Ra'anana 1-3 vs Hapoel Ironi Kiryat Shmona 1-3 Beitar Jerusalem || 0-2 vs Hapoel Ra'anana 1-3 vs Hapoel Ironi Kiryat Shmona 1-3 Beitar Jerusalem || 1-3 vs Maccabi Tel Aviv 0-2 vs Hapoel Be'er Sheva || N/A
|-
|align=left| Biggest win (Cup)    || 3-1 vs Ironi Ramat HaSharon || - ||  3-1 vs Ironi Ramat HaSharon || colspan=1|–
|-
|align=left| Biggest loss (Cup)    ||   vs Hapoel Ironi Kiryat Shmona ||   vs Hapoel Ironi Kiryat Shmona ||- || -
|-
|align=left| Biggest win (Toto)   || 2-0 vs Hapoel Haifa 5-3 vs Bnei Sakhnin 3-1 vs F.C. Ashdod || 2-0 vs Hapoel Haifa 5-3 vs Bnei Sakhnin  || 1-0 vs Hapoel Ironi Kiryat Shmona || 3-1 vs F.C. Ashdod
|-
|align=left| Biggest loss (Toto) || 0-2 vs Bnei Sakhnin || - || 0-2 vs Bnei Sakhnin || 1-2 vs Maccabi Tel Aviv
|-
|align=left| Clean sheets          || 12 || 7 || 5 || 0
|-
|align=left| Goals scored         || 70 || 43 || 23 || 4
|-
|align=left| Goals conceded       || 48 || 22 || 23 || 3 
|-
|align=left| Goal difference       || +22 || +21 || - || +1
|-
|-
|-
|align=left| Yellow cards        || 70 || 34 || 35 || 1
|-
|align=left| Red cards            || 6 || 3 || 3 || 0
|-
|align=left| Most appearances     || align=left| Hen Ezra (44)   || colspan=3|–
|-
|align=left| Most minutes played  || align=left|  Vladimir Stojković (3,660) || colspan=3|–
|-
|align=left| Most goals           || align=left|  Rubén Rayos (11)  || colspan=3|–
|-
|align=left| Winning rate         || % || % || % ||  %

References

External links
 Maccabi Haifa website

Maccabi Haifa F.C. seasons
Maccabi Haifa